The John S. Vest House is a historic house at 21 North West Street in Fayetteville, Arkansas.  It is a two-story brick structure with modest vernacular Italianate and Gothic Revival details, built in 1870 by John S. Vest, a transplanted New Yorker who owned a brickmaking operation.  It has a side-gable roof with a front-facing centered cross gable, with an extended eave that has paired Italianate brackets.  A single-story porch extends across most of the front supported by Doric columns, some of which are mounted on brick piers.

The house was listed on the National Register of Historic Places in 1979.

See also
National Register of Historic Places listings in Washington County, Arkansas

References

Houses on the National Register of Historic Places in Arkansas
Gothic Revival architecture in Arkansas
Italianate architecture in Arkansas
Houses completed in 1870
Houses in Fayetteville, Arkansas
National Register of Historic Places in Fayetteville, Arkansas